Pseudo-Sophronius (7th century) was an anonymous Greek orthodox chronicler who recorded an apocryphal account of Bartholomew the Apostle's travels to and preaching in Armenia and India.

References

Sources 
 

Christian manuscripts
Apocryphal Acts
7th-century Christians
Eastern Orthodox writers